Boleslaus II the Pious (c. 940 – 7 February 999), a member of the Přemyslid dynasty, was Duke of Bohemia from 972 until his death.

Life and reign
Boleslaus was an elder son of Duke Boleslaus I the Cruel and brother of the three other children of his father who survived to adulthood: Strachkvas, Doubravka (the wife of Duke Mieszko I of Poland) and the abbess Mlada. His mother may have been Biagota, a mysterious figure known only from her coins. According to some historians, she was the wife of Boleslaus I.

Alliances
Boleslaus II took over the rule of the Duchy of Bohemia as kníže (a title that may be translated either as duke or prince) on his father's death in 972. Like his father, Boleslaus II initially quarrelled with the Ottonian kings of Germany. In 974, he and Duke Mieszko I of Poland supported the rebellious Duke Henry II of Bavaria in his civil war against the rule of Emperor Otto II. In 976, Henry was defeated and fled to Boleslaus' court at Prague Castle, after which Otto's forces campaigned in the Bohemian lands. Finally in 978, Boleslaus solemnly pledged allegiance to the emperor at the Easter festivities in Quedlinburg. 

In turn, relations with Poland deteriorated from about 980 onwards. When Emperor Otto II died in 983 and was succeeded by his minor son Otto III, the Bohemian alliance with Poland was discarded, as Boleslaus again allied with the insurgent Bavarian Duke Henry, while Mieszko I took the side of the young king. Moreover, when Boleslaus occupied the Saxon Margravate of Meissen, he thwarted the plans of Mieszko's son Bolesław, who had married a daughter of Margrave Ricdag. In 987, Boleslaus had to retire from Meissen, and from about 990, he sparked a long-lasting conflict with Poland around the lands of Silesia and Lesser Poland (the Polish-Bohemian War). In 992, he approached King Otto III and participated in an unsuccessful campaign against the Lutici tribes in the wake of the Great Slav Rising of 983.

Unification of the Bohemian lands

Boleslaus's reign is most notable for the foundation of the Diocese of Prague in 973, which earned him the epithet "The Pious" by the medieval chronicler Cosmas of Prague. Nevertheless, the Bohemian diocese was placed at that time within the jurisdiction of the Archbishop of Mainz, and Emperor Otto II enforced the appointment of the Saxon monk Thietmar (Dětmar) as first bishop. 

Meanwhile, the struggle with the rival Slavník dynasty flared up again from 981 onwards, when Prince Soběslav of the Slavník dynasty began to forge alliances with the Polish and Saxons. Upon Bishop Dětmar's death in 982, Soběslav's brother Adalbert (later known as Saint Adalbert of Prague) was appointed his successor until he abandoned his primacy to lead a mission to the Old Prussians in 994. On 28 September 995, Boleslaus' forces and the confederate Vršovci clan stormed Libice Castle in southern Bohemia and massacred the members of the Slavník dynasty that were found there. Boleslaus's brutal triumph ensured the unity of Bohemia under a single ruler.

Marriages and issue 

Boleslaus's  first wife Adiva may have been a daughter of the English king Edward the Elder (the daughter known to English historians as "Ælfgifu" who married a prince "near the Alps"), though the evidence for this is weak. His second wife was Emma of Mělník. It is certain that Boleslaus's oldest son was born by Adiva, but the mother of the others cannot be established with certainty:
 Boleslaus III (c. 965 – 1037), his eldest son and successor
 Wenceslaus, died as an infant
 Jaromír (c. 975 - 1035), became Duke of Bohemia in 1003
 Oldřich (c.  975 – 1034), became Duke of Bohemia in 1012.
Soon after his father's death, Boleslaus III entered into conflict with his brothers and was deposed in 1002. The internal struggles of the Přemyslid dynasty shook the Bohemian duchy until Duke Oldřich's efforts stabilised the country.

References

Bibliography

Joanna A. Sobiesiak: Bolesław II Przemyślida (†999): Dynasta i jego państwo. Kraków: Avalon, 2006

Dukes of Bohemia
Christian monarchs
920s births
999 deaths
10th-century rulers in Europe
Year of birth uncertain
Burials at St. George's Basilica, Prague